The 1998 Grand Prix Hassan II was an Association of Tennis Professionals men's tennis tournament played on outdoor clay courts in Casablanca, Morocco. It was the 14th edition of the tournament and was held from 23 March until 30 March 1998. Fourth-seeded Andrea Gaudenzi  won the singles title.

Finals

Singles

 Andrea Gaudenzi defeated  Álex Calatrava 6–4, 5–7, 6–4
 It was Gaudenzi's 2nd title of the year and the 3rd of his career.

Doubles

 Andrea Gaudenzi /  Diego Nargiso defeated  Cristian Brandi /  Filippo Messori 6–4, 7–6
 It was Gaudenzi's 1st title of the year and the 2nd of his career. It was Nargiso's only title of the year and the 4th of his career.

References

External links 
 ITF tournament edition details
 ATP tournament profile

 

 
Grand Prix Hassan II
Grand Prix Hassan II